Younan Xia (born 1965) is a Chinese-American chemist, materials scientist, and bioengineer. He is the Brock Family Chair and Georgia Research Alliance (GRA) Eminent Scholar in Nanomedicine in the Wallace H. Coulter Department of Biomedical Engineering, with joint appointments in the School of Chemistry & Biochemistry, the School of Chemical & Biomolecular Engineering, and Parker H. Petit Institute for Bioengineering & Bioscience at the Georgia Institute of Technology.

Early life and education
Xia was born in Jingjiang, Jiangsu, China in 1965. After receiving his B.S. degree in chemical physics from the University of Science and Technology of China (USTC) in 1987, he pursued graduate studies at the Fujian Institute of Research on the Structure of Matter until the end of 1990.

He moved to the United States in 1991 and earned his M.S. degree in inorganic chemistry from University of Pennsylvania with Alan G. MacDiarmid in 1993. He received his Ph.D. degree in physical chemistry from Harvard University with George M. Whitesides in 1996.

Research
The current research of Xia and his group centers on the development of new chemistry, physics, and technological applications of nanostructured materials – a class of materials which feature sizes less than 100 nm.  His research includes the chemistry and physics of nanomaterial synthesis, the application of nanomaterials to biomedical research, and developing nanomaterials for energy- and environment-related applications.

Xia co-invented soft lithography while he was a PhD student with George M. Whitesides at Harvard University. As an independent researcher, he and his group have made original and important contributions to the following areas: colloidal crystals and their photonic applications, colloidal assembly, one-dimensional nanostructures, electrospinning and alignment of nanofibers, electrospun nanofibers as scaffolds for tissue engineering, and shape-controlled synthesis of colloidal nanocrystals and their applications in plasmonics, spectroscopy, heterogeneous catalysis, and electrocatalysis, invention of silver nanostructures with many different morphologies such as nanowires and nanocubes, and invention of gold nanocages and exploration of their biomedical applications.

Involvements with academic journals
Xia served as an Associate Editor of Nano Letters for 17 years (2002-2019) and is currently serving on its advisory board. He has served or is serving on the Advisory Boards of Advanced Healthcare Materials (2011-, Chairman of the International advisory board), Nano Letters (2020-), Chemical Reviews (2019-), BME Frontiers (2019-), Research (2018-), ACS Applied Nano Materials (2018-), Small Methods (2017-), ChemNanoMat (2015-), Chemical Physics Letters (2014-), Chinese Journal of Chemistry (2014-), Chemistry: A European Journal (2014-), Cancer Nanotechnology (2014-), Particle & Particle Systems Characterization (2013-), Angewandte Chemie International Edition (2011-), Chemistry: An Asian Journal (2010-), Accounts of Chemical Research (2010-2016), Journal of Biomedical Optics (2010-2014), Science of Advanced Materials (2009-), Nano Research (2008-),  Nano Today (2006-), Langmuir (2005-2010, 2013-2015), Chemistry of Materials (2005-2007), International Journal of Nanotechnology (2003-), and Advanced Functional Materials (2001-), World Scientific Series in Nanoscience and Nanotechnology (2009-, World Scientific Publishers), Dekker Encyclopedia of Nanoscience and Nanotechnology (2001, Marcel Dekker Inc.). He has also served as a Guest Editor of special issues for Advanced Materials, Advanced Functional Materials, MRS Bulletin, and Accounts of Chemical Research.

Awards

Xia has received a number of prestigious awards, including Highly Cited Researchers in Chemistry and Materials Science, Clarivate Analytics (2020), Highly Cited Researchers in Chemistry and Materials Science, Clarivate Analytics (2019), Sigma Xi Sustained Research Award (2019), Highly Cited Researchers in Chemistry, Physics, and Materials Science (2018), NSF Special Creativity Award (2018), MRS Medal (2017), Inaugural Class of Hall of Fame (2017), Highly Cited Researchers in Chemistry, Physics, and Materials Science (2017), Outstanding Faculty Research Author Award (2017), Highly Cited Researchers in Chemistry and Materials Science (2016), Sigma Xi Best Faculty Paper Award (2016), Highly Cited Researchers in Chemistry, Physics, and Materials Science (2015), ACS Fellow (2014),  Highly cited researcher in chemistry and materials science (2014), Nano Today Award (2013), MRS Fred Kavli Distinguished Lectureship in Nanoscience (2013), ACS National Award in the Chemistry of Materials (2013), AIMBE Fellow (2011), MRS Fellow (2009 ), NIH Director's Pioneer Award (2006), ACS Leo Hendrik Baekeland Award (2005), Camille Dreyfus Teacher Scholar (2002), David and Lucile Packard Fellowship in Science and Engineering (2000), Alfred P. Sloan Research Fellow (2000), NSF Early Career Development Award (1999), ACS Victor K. LaMer Award (1999), NSF Faculty Early Career Development Award (1999), Chinese NSF Oversea Young Investigator Award (1999), Camille and Henry Dreyfus New Faculty Award (1997), and ACS ICI Student Award Finalist (1997).

Xia was named by Times Higher Education one of the Top 10 chemists (#5) in the world from 1999-2009 based on the number of citations per paper. He was also ranked one of the Top 100 material scientists (#4) and top 100 chemists (#35) in the world from 2000-2010 based on the number of citations per paper. He was named one of the world's most influential scientific minds in 2015 in the fields of Chemistry and Materials Science.

References

External links
 http://www.researcherid.com/rid/E-8499-2011
 https://scholar.google.com/citations?user=3gDWh4gAAAAJ&hl=zh-CN
 http://www.nanocages.com/

1965 births
Living people
American materials scientists
Harvard School of Engineering and Applied Sciences alumni
Fellows of the American Chemical Society
Fellows of the American Institute for Medical and Biological Engineering
University of Pennsylvania School of Arts and Sciences alumni
University of Science and Technology of China alumni
Chinese emigrants to the United States
Chinese materials scientists
Georgia Tech faculty
Scientists from Taizhou, Jiangsu
Sloan Research Fellows